The Liber Flavus Fergusiorum ("Yellow Book of the Ó Fearghuis"; RIA MS 23 O 48 a-b) is a medieval Irish text (dated to c. 1437-40) authored by the Ó Fearghuis, an Irish medical family of Connacht who were hereditary physicians to the Irish nobility.

Ó Fearghuis
The Ó Fearghuis name was conceived in the 7th century when Saint Máedóc of Ferns baptised and renamed the sons of Ailill, who was a 7th-great-grandson of Niall, High King of Ireland, as per his pedigree recorded in the Lives of Irish Saints, which reads: "Ailill, son of Rechtaide, son of Eitin, son of Felim, son of Caol, son of Áed, son of Ailill, son of Erc, son of Eógan, son of Niall of the Nine Hostages." The brothers mac Ailill thus became Fearghus and Faircheallaigh and were made Saint Máedóc's heirs to Rosinver Abbey and Drumlane Abbey. The Ó Fearghuis were themselves Irish nobility for descent from King Niall, originally based at Roscam, in Clann Fhergail. In the 13th century, they moved to what became County Mayo. In the 14th century, members of the family created the manuscript which came to be known as the Liber Flavus Fergusiorum.

Authorship

The Liber Flavus Fergusiorum was composed at various times by several different scribes of the Ó Fearghuis, the principal one identifying himself as Aedh. Two translators, Seaán Ó Conchubair and Uidhisdín Mag Raighin, are named in colophons. Ó Conchubair translated a work on the Office of the Dead into Irish, while Mag Raighin translated the Life of John the Evangelist. The book derives its name from the Ó Fearghuis family, whose descendant Dr. John Fergus brought the manuscript from County Mayo to Dublin in the 18th century. Upon his death in 1761, it was held by his daughter, Frances Arabella Kennedy, whose grandson deposited it in the Royal Irish Academy in 1875.

See also
 Irish medical families
 Irish nobility

References

Sources
 Catalogue of Irish manuscripts in the Royal Irish Academy (Dublin, 1933), Fasc. 10: 1254-73.
 E.J. Gwynn, "The Manuscript Known as the Liber Flavus Fergusiorum", Proceedings of the RIA 26 C 2, 15-40.
 Máire Herbert, "Medieval Collections of Ecclesiastical and Devotional Materials: Leabhar Breac, Liber Flavus Fergusiorum and The Book of Fenagh" in Bernadette Cunningham and Siobhán Fitzpatrick, Treasures of the Royal Irish Academy Library (Dublin, 2009), 33-43.
 Diarmuid Ó Laoghaire, "Beatha Eustasius agus Beatha Mhuire Éigipti", Celtica 21 (1990), 489-511.
 Diarmuid Ó Laoghaire, "Mary of Egypt in Irish: A Survey of the Sources", in Poppe and Ross, The Legend of Mary of Egypt in Medieval Insular Hagiography (Dublin, 1996), 255-7.

External links
 https://web.archive.org/web/20120508201733/http://www.ria.ie/Library/Special-Collections/Manuscripts/Liber-Flavus-Fergusiorum.aspx
 http://www.irishtimes.com/ancestor/surname/index.cfm?fuseaction=Go.&UserID=

Medieval literature
Irish-language literature
History of County Mayo
Irish manuscripts
1430s books